Rostom or Rustam Khan (1565 – 17 November 1658) was a Georgian royal, from the House of Bagrationi, who functioned as a Safavid-appointed vali (i.e. viceroy)/king of Kartli, eastern Georgia, from 1633 until his death.

Life 

A son of Daud Khan, a Georgian prince and convert to Islam, by a concubine, he was born in the Iranian royal capital of Isfahan as Khosro Mirza, and was brought up Muslim by eunuchs alongside young slave recruits. An intelligent and resolute in his decisions, he soon attracted the attention of Shah Abbas I of Safavid who appointed him, in 1618, a darugha (prefect) of Isfahan. From 1625 to 1626, he took part in suppression of the Georgian opposition: he commanded a right flank at the victorious Battle of Marabda and saved part of the Persian troops from a complete disaster at the Battle of Ksani. In 1626, Khosro Mirza was recalled from Georgia and appointed the commander of the Shah's élite gholam corps (qollar-aghasi) three years later. In 1629, Abbas, lying on a deathbed, urged him to protect a grandson and heir Sam Mirza, the future Shah Safi, whom Khosro served faithfully. In 1630, he led a Persian army which defeated the Ottoman forces and captured Baghdad. In the early 1630s, he took part in sidelining and destruction of the Undiladze family, also of Georgian origin, who had dominated the Safavid court for years. Afterwards, he was sent to suppress the opposition of Georgians who had managed to unite the eastern regions of Kartli and Kakheti under Teimuraz I for a brief period of 1630–1633. Teimuraz was joined by a surviving Undiladze, Daud Khan. For his loyalty, Shah Safi appointed him as the new vali of Kartli, and granted him the name of Rostam Khan (Rostom, როსტომი, in Georgian transliteration). Rostom then came to Georgia with a large Persian army commanded by his fellow Georgian Rustam Khan. He soon took control of Kartli and garrisoned all major fortresses with Persian forces, bringing them, however, under his tight control. His willingness to cooperate with his suzerain won for Kartli a larger degree of autonomy. A period of relative peace and prosperity ensued, with the cities and towns being revived, many deserted areas repopulated and commerce flourished. Although Muslim, Rostom helped to restore a major Georgian Orthodox cathedral of Living Pillar (Svetitskhoveli) at Mtskheta, and patronised Christian culture. However, Islam and Persian habits predominated at his court. He ruthlessly crushed an opposition of local nobles, putting to death the catholicos Eudemus I of Georgia, and invaded, in 1648, Kakheti, forcing Teimuraz to flee to Imereti (western Georgia).

Throughout his reign, Rostom imported Persian language and culture into Kartlian administration and daily life. As he had no children, Rostom intended to make the Imeretian prince Mamuka his heir. The latter, however, was soon suspected to have been involved in a plot, and he had to return to his native Imereti. In 1642, Rostom adopted his kinsman Luarsab, Luarsab I of Kartli's great-grandson, but he was assassinated in 1652 while hunting. Another candidate for the succession, Rostom's stepson Otia, also died young, in 1646. Only in 1653 was able Rostom to choose his successor. It was Vakhtang of Mukhrani, a representative of a junior Mukhrani branch of the Bagrationi dynasty, who actually ran government in the last years of Rostom, and succeeded on his death on November 17, 1658. Rostom was buried in Qom, Persia, close to his late suzerain Abbas I. The 19th-century British diplomat Robert Grant Watson reported in his A History of Persia, "in one of the finest of tho gardens adjacent to tho city was the mausoleum of Rustem Khan, a prince of the royal house of Georgia who had embraced the tenets of the Mahomedan religion in order to obtain the viceroyalty of his native country."

Family 
Rostom was married twice. After his return to Kartli, he wed c. 1635 Ketevan, daughter of Prince Gorjasp Abashishvili. Marie-Félicité Brosset, followed by Cyril Toumanoff, erred in identifying her surname as Abashidze. The Abashishvili was a branch of the Baratashvili family. The wedding was celebrated in Christian and Muslim rites and Ketevan added a Persian name, Guldukhtar. The marriage was childless and Ketevan died shortly thereafter.

In 1638, Rostom concluded a strategic marital alliance with the Dadiani princely dynasty of Mingrelia. His second wife was Mariam, sister of Levan II Dadiani, the reigning Prince of Mingrelia, and the former wife of Simon Gurieli, Prince of Guria. They had no children. After Rostom's death, Mariam was married his adopted son and successor, Vakhtang V.

See also 
 Iranian Georgians

References

Sources

External links 

 Iranian-Georgian Relations in the 16th- 19th Centuries
 Georgians in the Safavid administration

Bagrationi dynasty of the Kingdom of Kartli
1565 births
Safavid appointed kings of Kartli
Shia Muslims from Georgia (country)
1658 deaths
Iranian people of Georgian descent
Illegitimate children of Georgian monarchs
Safavid generals
Safavid prefects of Isfahan
Qollar-aghasi
Burials in Iran
16th-century people of Safavid Iran
17th-century people of Safavid Iran
People from Isfahan